Populina is a municipality in the state of São Paulo in Brazil. The population is 4,152 (2020 est.) in an area of 315.9 km2. The elevation is 443 m. The HDI was 0.755 – medium in 2000.

References 

Municipalities in São Paulo (state)